Make Me A Star is the third album by Japanese jazz fusion band "The Square" (which changed its name to  T-Square in 1989), recorded and released in 1979. This is also the first album on which saxophonist Takeshi Itoh used the Lyricon.

Track listing 
Sources

Personnel 
Masahiro Andoh – guitars
Takeshi Itoh – alto saxophone, Lyricon
Junko Miyagi – acoustic piano, Rhodes piano, Korg MS-20, PS-3100, Hohner D6 Clavinet, Oberheim, Minimoog, ARP Odyssey, Yamaha CS-80
Yuhji Nakamura – bass
Michael S. Kawai – drums, percussion, voice
Kiyohiko Senba – percussion, congas, tsuzumi, ōtsuzumi, shime-daiko, synthesizer percussion, glockenspiel
Shirō Sagisu – conductor, music arrangement (strings and brass section), Oberheim, Yamaha CS-80
Kayoko Ishu Group – vocals on "Mr. Coco's One", "Make Me A Star" and "Life is a Music"
Shin Kazuhara Group – trumpet on "Make Me A Star"
Eiji Arai Group – trombone on  "Make Me A Star"
Tadaaki Obuo Strings – strings on "Make Me A Star" and "I Will Sing A Lullaby"

References

1979 albums
T-Square (band) albums